Sankt Marein bei Knittelfeld is a former municipality in the district of Murtal in Styria, Austria. Since the 2015 Styria municipal structural reform, it is part of the municipality Sankt Marein-Feistritz.

References

Cities and towns in Murtal District